Shanti Mullick is an Indian former women's footballer who played as a forward for the India women's national football team. Mullick is the first Indian women's footballer to receive the Arjuna Award, the second-highest Indian sports award.

Career

Football
Mullick was born in Kalighat, Kolkata, West Bengal and her father was also a footballer who served in the military.

Mullick represented India at the AFC Women's Championships where the team reached the finals twice and finished as runners-up in the 1980 and 1983 editions. She played for the national team managed by legendary Sushil Bhattacharya. Her team also finished in third place in the 1981 edition. She captained the Indian team between 1981 and 1983. Mullick was the first women's footballer to score a hat-trick for India in a 5–0 victory over Singapore in the 1981 AFC Women's Championship.

Following her retirement, she runs a football academy and coaches youth women's footballers.

Field hockey
Mullick also played field hockey from 1986 to 1994 while posted at Eastern Railway.

Honours

Player

India
 AFC Women's Championship runner-up: 1980, 1983; third place: 1981

Manager

Bengal
 Senior Women's National Football Championship: 1996–97

Individual
 Arjuna Award: 1983

References

Bibliography

Taylor & Francis: Soccer and Society (2005). The gendered kick: Women's soccer in twentieth century India, Soccer & Society, 6:2–3, 270–284, DOI: 10.1080/14660970500106469.

Living people
1964 births
Footballers from Kolkata
Sportswomen from West Bengal
Indian women's footballers
India women's international footballers
Women's association football forwards
Recipients of the Arjuna Award
Indian football coaches